Calochortus ciscoensis is a North American species of flowering plants in the lily family first described for modern science in 2008. It was originally described as only occurring only in eastern Utah (Uintah, Duchesne, and Grand Counties) but has since also been found in Mesa County, Colorado).

Calochortus ciscoensis is a bulb-forming perennial herb each bulb producing several stalks up to 40 cm tall. Flowers range from white to pink.  It typically lacks, or has a significantly reduced, chevron as compared to Calochortus nuttalli with which it is closely allied and may be confused.  Unlike C. nuttalli it tends to grow in clusters typically with multiple flowers and has long, drooping leaves that are present at the time of flowering, and it grows only at relatively low elevations on harsh substrates.

References

External links
SEINet, Arizona Chapter,  Calochortus ciscoensis S.L.Welsh & N.D.Atwood  several color photos

ciscoensis
Flora of Utah
Plants described in 2008
Flora without expected TNC conservation status